Jalal-ud-din (born 12 June 1959) is a former Pakistani cricketer who played in six Test matches and eight One Day Internationals from 1982 to 1985.

Cricket career
A specialist right-arm pace bowler, he was the first player to take a hat-trick in ODI cricket. He did so while playing against Australia at Niaz Stadium, Hyderabad on 20 September 1982.

Coaching career
He is now a coach, and is the only Pakistani Test cricketer who has the accreditation as both an ECB and PCB level 3 coach. As of February 2021, he was a level 4 coach.

In January 2018, he was appointed chief selector to the Pakistan women's team. In March 2019, former Pakistan women's team captain Urooj Mumtaz replaced him in the position.

In October 2020, he was appointed as USA’s national selector for the South-West Zone, responsible for selecting the men's seniors and youth teams.

Cricket academies
Considered a pioneer of "cricket academies concept" in Pakistan, Jalal established the Customs Cricket Academy (CCA) in 1999 and the Vital Five Cricket Academy (VFCA) in 2009, both located in Karachi. 

In August 2009, the Korangi Town administration launched another of his cricket academies, the Jalaluddin Cricket Academy (JCA), located in Karachi's Zaman Town. Aiming to nurture talent at grassroots level, it offers free coaching through highly trained professionals to under-privileged local cricketers.

References 

Pakistani cricketers
1959 births
Living people
Pakistan Test cricketers
Pakistan One Day International cricketers
One Day International hat-trick takers
Karachi B cricketers
Karachi Blues cricketers
Karachi Whites cricketers
Public Works Department cricketers
Industrial Development Bank of Pakistan cricketers
Karachi cricketers
Pakistan Customs cricketers
Allied Bank Limited cricketers
Pakistani cricket coaches